Košarkaški klub Partizan (English: Partizan Basketball Club), commonly referred to as KK Partizan or simply Partizan, is a professional basketball team based in Belgrade, Serbia. It is part of the multi-sports Belgrade-based club Partizan. The club is a founding member and shareholder of the Adriatic Basketball Association, and competes in the ABA League, the EuroLeague and in the Basketball League of Serbia.

Since 1945, Partizan has won 48 trophies and is the holder of the 21 national champion titles. They have also won 16 national basketball cups, 6 Adriatic championships and 1 ABA League Supercup, and most notably the European Champion trophy at the Final Four of the EuroLeague in Istanbul in 1992. The final game was notable for the buzzer-beater by Aleksandar Đorđević which ranks among the most famous shots in basketball history. They also won 3 Korać Cups in 1978, 1979 and 1989 and participated in four Euroleague Final Fours. In September 2009, Partizan became the first and to this day the only Serbian team to play an official game against an NBA team.



History

1945–1971: Formation and early years
The club was established on 4 October 1945, as a basketball section of the Sports Association of the Central House of the Yugoslav Army. The first club championship of Yugoslavia was held in 1946, and Partizan participated with a team consisting mostly of players from Yugoslav Army basketball team, which in 1945 won the unofficial state championship against the teams of Yugoslav republics. KK Partizan officially split from the Army in 1953, since the entire sports society became independent and was renamed as Partizan Yugoslav Sports Association (JSD Partizan).

Although with a strong roster, including many players who played for the national team of Yugoslavia, Partizan waited for the first title of Yugoslav champion until 1976. In the first 30 years of its history, most well-known Partizan players have included Mirko Marjanović, Božidar Munćan, Radomir Šaper, Vilmoš Loci, Lajoš Engler, Čedomir Stojičević, Borislav Stanković, Borislav Ćurčić, Branko Radović, Radovan Radović, Miloš Bojović, Dragutin Čermak, Slobodan Jelić and others. During this period Partizan finished second-placed in the championship of Yugoslavia on five occasions. On two occasions (in 1950 and 1951) it even had the same number of points as the winner, but barely missed the title of national champion.

1971–1981: Creating a powerhouse

The rise of Partizan into a major basketball club that will eventually become one of the most successful in Europe, started in the early 70's, when former players took over the management and the coaching job was taken by national team coach Ranko Žeravica. He selected a group of young players led by exceptionally talented Dražen Dalipagić and Dragan Kićanović. Since Žeravica, as the national team coach (until 1965 as an assistant to Aleksandar Nikolić and then as head coach), closely followed the trends of international basketball for more than ten years, including the NBA, he aimed to combine the best features of American and Soviet concepts of the game, and adapt them to the specifics and the mentality of the players from Belgrade, Serbia and the rest of Yugoslavia. He gathered around him other young coaches, and in the late 1970s, when Žeravica went coaching abroad, his former associates Borislav Ćorković and Dušan Ivković successfully took over the team.

This important period in the club's history was crowned with several trophies. The first of these was the title of Yugoslav champion in 1975–76 season. Partizan also started to make noise in the European competitions with two back-to-back titles in the European Korać Cup (1978 in Banja Luka, KK Bosna was defeated with 117–110, while in 1979 Partizan defeated Italian Arrigoni 108–98). The first double was won in 1978–79 and another national championship title came in 1980–81.

In addition to coaches Žeravica, Ćorković and Ivković, notable players included, above all Dražen Dalipagić and Dragan Kićanović, but also Dragutin Čermak, Goran Latifić (captain of the first championship team in 1976), Josip Farčić, Dragan Todorić, Dušan Kerkez, Miodrag Marić, Boban Petrović, Arsenije Pešić, Boris Beravs, Milenko Savović, Jadran Vujačić, Nebojša Zorkić, Žarko Zečević and others.

1985–1991: The new "Dream Team"
After a couple of quiet years and a generational shift, a new generation of top players developed towards the end of the 1980s, under the leadership of the new club director, Dragan Kićanović.

The generation of Željko Obradović, Milenko Savović and Goran Grbović, followed by younger Aleksandar Đorđević, Vlade Divac, Žarko Paspalj, Ivo Nakić, Miroslav Pecarski and Oliver Popović and led by young coach Duško Vujošević, brought Partizan back to the top of Yugoslav and European basketball.

That generation won the title of national champion in 1986–87, and in 1988, following a dominant performance in the quarterfinal round of the Champions Cup and victories over major European clubs including FC Barcelona, Maccabi Tel Aviv, Aris and Tracer Milano, qualified for the Final Four in the Belgian city of Ghent. After an unexpected loss in the semifinals to Maccabi Tel Aviv (82–87), Partizan defeated Aris (105–93) and finished in the third place in Europe.

In 1989, enforced by young Predrag Danilović, Partizan won the FIBA Korać Cup for the third time, triumphing over Wiwa Vismara Cantù. After losing the first game in Italy (76–89), Partizan won the return leg in Belgrade with 101–82. That same season, Partizan won the Yugoslav Cup by defeating the crowned European champions Jugoplastika (87–74).

Continental recognition of this second great generation of players attracted more talented basketball players to the club, but at the same time, interest from financially more powerful clubs in Europe and the United States for the best Yugoslav players significantly reduced their time spent in the home country. Partizan's Vlade Divac and Žarko Paspalj in late 1989, along with Dražen Petrović from Cibona became the first players from Yugoslavia who pursued their careers in the NBA league.

First team coaches in the mid-1980s also included Borislav Džaković, Vladislav Lučić and Zoran Slavnić.

1991–1992: At the top of Europe
After the departure of Divac, Paspalj, Grbović, Savović and other main players from the 80's, Partizan started the 1991–92 season with a rejuvenated squad, led by an exceptionally talented backcourt pair of Aleksandar Đorđević and Predrag Danilović. A previous team captain and former national team player with no coaching experience, Želimir Obradović, was chosen as a first team coach. Another former Partizan coach and player, an established European basketball expert, professor Aleksandar Nikolić became his counselor.

The season didn't start well at all - ethnic conflicts in the reagon had escalated towards the autumn of 1991 and FIBA decided not to allow teams from the former Yugoslavia to play their home games at their home venues. Belgrade's "Black and Whites" have opted to be "hosts" in the Madrid suburb of Fuenlabrada, in the Polideportivo Fernando Martín arena. This proved to be a right move as the Spanish crowd was very supportive of their adopted team.

Obradović's team began a long season of European and domestic matches, often traveling thousands of kilometers in just a few days, with performance gradually improving. Partizan finished the competition in the group stage in the Euroleague in fourth place with nine wins and five defeats. That meant that Partizan had to play crucial matches to qualify for the Final Four with Knorr Bologna. Bolognese had a strong team led by former Yugoslav national team player Jurij Zdovc. However, Đorđević, Danilović, Ivo Nakić, Zoran Stevanović, Vladimir Dragutinović, Željko Rebrača, Mlađan Šilobad, Slaviša Koprivica, Nikola Lončar and Dragiša Šarić came on top in three games and for the second time qualified for the Final Four.

At the Final Four held in Abdi İpekçi Arena in Istanbul in April 1992, Partizan won the title of European champion. In the Final Four, Partizan won both games – in the semifinals they defeated Italian Philips Milano and in the finals Spanish Montigalà Joventut (71–70), with an iconic three-pointer in the last second by Aleksandar Đorđević. The average age of the team was only 21.7 years, and out of 17 games all but one (the quarter-final game against Knorr Bologna) were played on foreign grounds.

The season finished triumphantly with victories in the national championship and the Cup.

1992–1995: Time of Isolation
After the Istanbul triumph, Đorđević and Danilović moved to Italy. They ended in two clubs that Partizan defeated a few months earlier, during its "conquest of Europe" – Danilović in Knorr and Đorđević in Phillips. The departure of the back-court pair proved to be an irreparable loss. Because of the UN sanctions against FR Yugoslavia, Partizan was not allowed to defend the European title in 1992–93 season. In 1993–94 season, led by coach Željko Lukajić Partizan won the national cup, and the next season was again successful. The team coached by Borislav Džaković won both domestic league and cup. The new generation of players included Nikola Lončar, Miroslav Berić, Haris Brkić, Željko Rebrača, Predrag Drobnjak, Aleksandar Čubrilo. In 1995 the UN sanctions were lifted and Serbian and Montenegrin clubs were again able to compete in European competitions. Inexperienced squad didn't achieve any significant results in their returning season in Europe, but, under the guidance of Ranko Žeravica they still defended the national title in 1995–96 and secured another season in Europe's top competition.

1996–1998: Again at the Top

In 1996–97 season Partizan, led by new coach Miroslav Nikolić, qualified for the Top 16 of Euroleague where it was eliminated by later European champion Olympiacos. Partizan defended the title in the domestic league led by players such as Dejan Tomašević, Dejan Koturović, and Dragan Lukovski. Next season, 1997–98, was a success in Euroleague. Two years after the 3-season long UN sanctions ended, Partizan qualified for the Final Four for the third time. After a series of defeats in the group stage, Miroslav Nikolić resigned and was replaced by Milovan Bogojević and the results improved. Partizan first eliminated the reigning champion Olympiacos, and then, in the quarterfinals, the Russian champions CSKA. After the departure of Berić and Koturović, enforced with new backcourt pair Miroslav Radošević and Vladimir Đokić, Partizan went on to the Final Four in Barcelona where it took the fourth place, after playing eventual champions Kinder Bologna and Benetton Treviso. However, the season in domestic competition was unsuccessful, and some leading players like Predrag Drobnjak departed the club.

1998–2001: The new millennium and the return of the club legends
After a disappointing domestic league ending, Vladislav Lučić was appointed as a new head coach of the club. The domestic 1998–99 season was not completed due to the NATO bombing of Yugoslavia, but Partizan still won the Yugoslav Cup, defeating KK FMP in the finals, in a game that was played to the sound civil defense sirens. Despite the ongoing air strikes, the game was completed. Partizan reached the quarterfinals of the 1999 Saporta Cup. At the end of the season, most of the players left the club, and another young squad was formed. Led by coach Nenad Trajković and players Radоšević, Đokić, Čubrilo, Nenad Čanak, Ratko Varda, Veselin Petrović, Dragan Marković Partizan defended the Yugoslav Cup trophy. 2000–01 season was marked by the comeback of experienced players Berić, Nikola Bulatović, Aleksandar Glintić, Branko Milisavljević while club legends Vlade Divac, Predrag Danilović and Žarko Paspalj returned as part of the club management. Darko Ruso was appointed as a coach, and Partizan reached the Top 16 of Euroleague. In December 2000 a fan-favorite Haris Brkić, who returned to club just weeks earlier, was shot and killed outside of Pionir Hall.

2001–2014: The Vujošević and Danilović era

Duško Vujošević's return to the position of a head coach in 2001 and Predrag Danilović's presidency marked the beginning of a rise in the fortunes of the club. Between 2001 and 2014, Partizan has been by far the most successful club in Serbia and the ex-Yugoslav region, winning thirteen consecutive national titles, six national cups (five consecutive from 2008 to 2012), and six Adriatic league titles (five consecutive from 2007 to 2011). From the turn of the century, Partizan also managed to remain fully competitive in the Euroleague, while still developing players, including some of the best big men in European basketball, such as Nikola Peković, Aleks Marić, Kosta Perović, Jan Veselý, Novica Veličković, Milan Mačvan and, before them, Nenad Krstić. The highlight of the era were the three consecutive Euroleague playoff appearances from 2008 to 2010, with the latter being the year in which the club once again reached the EuroLeague Final Four.

2001–2006: Beginning of the domination in Serbian league
In the period between 2001 and 2006 Partizan struggled with its results in Euroleague. However, on the domestic front, Partizan was highly successful and built up for European success in the following years. During these years, notable players from Partizan champion squads included Miloš Vujanić, Nenad Krstić, Vule Avdalović, young national team players Uroš Tripković, Luka Bogdanović, Kosta Perović, Boris Bakić, Dejan Borovnjak, Novica Veličković. They were supported by more experienced players such as Vlado Šćepanović, Đuro Ostojić, Dejan Milojević, Predrag Šuput, Petar Božić, Fred House and Vonteego Cummings.

2006–2010: Euroleague and Adriatic League success
In the 2006–07 season, In addition to the sixth consecutive title in Serbia, Partizan won its first Adriatic league trophy, defeating another Serbian club FMP, in the finals. Dušan Kecman, Milenko Tepić, Nikola Peković, with Veličković, Cummings, Perović, Bakić, Bogdanović also reached the TOP 16 of Euroleague. On 17 August 2007, Partizan signed an agreement with Bosnian club KK Igokea on technical cooperation, known as "Partizan Igokea". The season 2007–08 was a big come back to the top of European basketball. Partizan Igokea was successful in Euroleague, and strengthened with Milt Palacio, Slavko Vraneš, Čedomir Vitkovac Partizan Igokea knocked out of the competition European champions Panathinaikos, but was stopped in the quarterfinals by TAU Cerámica in a close fought encounter.

In the national league, Partizan Igokea won the first of four consecutive triple crowns, uniting the titles in national league, national cup and regional league.

In the 2008–09 season Partizan defended all three trophies. New players Aleksandar Rašić, Stéphane Lasme, Jan Veselý played well alongside established stars Veličković, Tepić, Tripković, Vraneš, Božić and reached the quarterfinals of Euroleague again, where they were eliminated by CSKA. On 5 March 2009, Partizan and its fans became record holders, setting a record crowd of 22,567 in a game against Panathinaikos, the highest ever attendance for any basketball game held indoors in Europe.  Coach Vujošević was given the highest coaching award in Europe, the Euroleague Coach of the Year Award, and Partizan was chosen by Euroleague to go on tour against NBA teams, becoming one of the selected few clubs to represent European basketball in the United States.

The 2009–10 season was one of the most successful seasons in the history of KK Partizan. Main players from the previous seasons Uroš Tripković, Novica Veličković, Milenko Tepić, Stéphane Lasme left the club. Experienced Dušan Kecman returned and Aleks Marić, Bo McCalebb, Lawrence Roberts were brought in. Partizan played better from one game to another, and Pionir Hall remained impregnable fortress for many European greats like Efes Pilsen or FC Barcelona. Partizan again went to quarterfinals and this time faced Israeli powerhouse Maccabi Tel Aviv. Partizan went past their opponent in big style and secured the fourth Final Four of Euroleague. In the final tournament of Euroleague held in Paris, Partizan played even with their rivals but was lost in the final seconds of the semi-final to Olympiacos 80–83 and in the 3rd place game to CSKA Moscow 88–90. Both games were decided in overtime. Partizan again defended national league and cup titles.

The final game of the 2010 Adriatic league remains as one of the most memorable in the history. Played in front of the sold-out Arena Zagreb against longtime rivals from Croatia Cibona. Cibona trailed 68–72 with a few seconds left, but back-to-back triples by Marko Tomas and Bojan Bogdanović gave their team a 74–72 lead with just 0.6 seconds left. Cibona players and the crowd already began to celebrate the title, but Partizan had the game's final possession and Dušan Kecman banked in a game-winning triple from midcourt at the buzzer, to make Partizan win another Adriatic League title in front of the shocked crowd and opposition players.

2010–2012: Vujošević departs
Before the 2010–11 season, Duško Vujošević, the most successful Partizan coach in history left the club after nine seasons to sign with CSKA Moscow. Vlada Jovanović, previously his assistant, became the new head coach. The change in coaching position was followed by changes in playing squad as Marić, McCalebb, Roberts, Vraneš, Rašić left the club. New players were brought in: Nathan Jawai, James Gist, Curtis Jerrells, Raško Katić. Along with crowd favorite Jan Veselý these players made the first five, the first time that Partizan relied mainly on foreign players. The departure of Vujošević initially affected the results, but as the season went on Partizan's play improved and the team again won three trophies – national double and the regional league. In Euroleague, Partizan achieved its primary goal and qualified for the Top 16 phase.

Again, most of the starters left the team before the 2011–12 season began. Serbian national team players Milan Mačvan and Miroslav Raduljica were loaned in, and young players Vladimir Lučić and Dragan Milosavljević got more playing time. Partizan took advantage of the NBA lockout to bring in its former player, center Nikola Peković. With most of the play revolving around him, Partizan got close to securing another Euroleague Top 16 spot, but due to an end of the lockout Peković returned to the NBA in early December. Without him, Partizan lost all three remaining fixtures and after five consecutive years, failed to qualify further. In the regional Adriatic League, Partizan was stopped in the semifinals, ending its five-year reign in the competition. On the domestic front, however, Partizan extended its success, winning another double.

2012–2014: Vujošević returns with the rejuvenated squad
The beginning of the 2012–13 season saw the return of Duško Vujošević to the club. Petar Božić, long-term captain, retired. Vladimir Lučić was appointed as captain, and Dragan Milosavljević became vice-captain. Dušan Kecman and Milan Mačvan were also among the players who left. The squad was rejuvenated, with the oldest player Marko Čakarević being just 24 years old. Initially, the results in Euroleague suffered, with Partizan's supertalented but inexperienced squad being knocked-out of the group stage. After mixed performances in the ABA League regular season, Partizan performed well in the final four, winning its sixth regional title, and securing another season in Euroleague. In the Serbian championship, Partizan successfully defended the trophy and brought its record to twenty national titles, the last twelve being consecutive. The season was marked by the rise of young players such as Dāvis Bertāns, Bogdan Bogdanović, Léo Westermann and Nikola Milutinov.

The 2013–14 season started with a success in Euroleage, where Partizan returned to the Top16 group, with youngsters such as Joffrey Lauvergne, Bogdanović, Bertāns, Westermann, Milutinov leading the team and enforced by a former NBA player Aleksandar Pavlović. However, Partizan suffered at the Final Four of the Adriatic League with a defeat at a buzzer by Cedevita in the semifinals. Despite the shocking loss, the team bounced and finished the season by winning its thirteenth consecutive national title, again defeating their archrivals Crvena zvezda by 3–1 in the final series.

2014–2017: Financial troubles
Having lost an ABA league title and therefore a place in Euroleague after almost a decade and a half, a talented generation from the previous two season's disbanded and Partizan entered the 2014–15 season with an almost brand new squad. Despite the efforts of experienced Pavlović, Mačvan, Tepić and younger Edo Murić Partizan struggled to finished fourth in the regular season of the Adriatic League, only to be eliminated in the playoff semifinals. In Eurocup, Partizan was eliminated in the first round. Partizan was also eliminated in the Serbian Cup and failed to defend the Serbian League title, losing to Red Star Belgrade in the final series. Without any silverware won, the season was the worst in fourteen years and marked the beginning of a three year long dry spell.

The summer of 2015 included many organizational and roster changes. The board of directors suggested Nikola Peković, former Partizan player, for the next team president, after the resignation of Predrag Danilović. Soon after that, longtime head coach Vujošević departed and Petar Božić was offered a head coach position. Main players also left the club, with young Vanja Marinković becoming the new team captain.

At the beginning of 2016, Partizan severed the contract with Petar Božić after a worst half-season in recent Partizan history. Aleksandar Džikić was appointed as a new coach, and managed to finish Adriatic League season on the 5th position, and finish the Serbian League at the second place, losing to Crvena zvezda in the finals.

In 2016–17 season Partizan played in Basketball Champions League, having withdrawn from the Eurocup. The team captain was Novica Veličković who returned to the club. In the group stage, Partizan finished as 3rd and passed to the play-off where they were eliminated by PAOK. After being eliminated in the Adriatic League in the playoff semifinals and Serbian League also in semifinals Partizan ended up without a single trophy won for a third consecutive year.

2017–present: Rebuilding the image

In the summer of 2017, club's president Peković stepped down, and Ostoja Mijailović replaced him. Partizan started the 2017–18 season with Miroslav Nikolić as new head coach. However, due to poor results, he was sacked in December 2017. During the same month, president Ostoja Mijailović stated that Partizan owes around 7.19 million euros and that creditors are considering blocking its bank account. On 14 December 2017, former player Nenad Čanak was named as the head coach of Partizan. There were many roster changes throughout the season. One of the best players Patrick Miller left Partizan and the club signed Kwame Vaughn and Bandja Sy. After a good run in next two months, Partizan again finished on the 5th position in Adriatic League. In February 2018, Partizan won the first trophy after almost four years, Radivoj Korać Cup, defeating their archrivals Crvena zvezda 81–75 in final. Partizan played in the Eurocup but finished with a 1–9 record and last place in their group. The Superleague campaign also finished unsuccessfully because Partizan lost to Crvena Zvezda in the Playoff semifinals thus failing to win the League title for a fourth consecutive season. Nigel Williams-Goss marked this season as the top player and left for Olympiacos and later NBA.

Partizan acquired Jock Landale, Rade Zagorac, Marcus Paige and several other mostly younger players during summer 2018. After a difficult start to the 2018–2019 season, including losing five consecutive games both in the ABA League and the 2018–19 EuroCup Basketball season, Čanak resigned and was replaced by Andrea Trinchieri as the new head coach. Under Trinchieri, the performance improved and Partizan finally captured some of the former European success, qualifying for the Top16 in the EuroCup. A home loss to Rytas prevented Partizan from qualifying for the playoffs, finishing with a 2–4 record in the Top16. In regional ABA League competition, Partizan finished in fourth place of the regular season and eventually lost the semifinal series to Crvena zvezda with 2–1. Partizan defended the trophy in the Radivoj Korać Cup, again by defeating Crvena zvezda 76–74 in the final.

For the 2019–20 season, Marinković, Sy and Landale departed and Nemanja Gordić, Rashawn Thomas, Corey Walden, William Mosley and several others were brought in. Partizan started the season strong, but eventually the season was canceled due to COVID-19 pandemic. In 2020–21 season, Partizan failed to qualify to the ABA League Playofs, lost to Mega in the semifinals of the Serbian League and finished in Top 16 phase of EuroCup.

In the summer of 2021, Željko Obradović became the team's new head coach, and Partizan started complete roster rebuild. The roster has been strengthened with players like, Kevin Punter, Mathias Lessort, Zach LeDay, Yam Madar and Aleksa Avramović. During the 2021–22 EuroCup season Partizan finished second in the group A, but was eliminated in the eightfinal by the 7th seed of group B Frutti Extra Bursaspor 95–103 in Belgrade. Partizan also made it to the Playoffs Finals series of the 2021–22 ABA League, where they lost with 3–2 in closely contested series and marked with off-court incidents, to Crvena zvezda. Because of these incidents, Partizan withdrew from the semifinal series of the 2021–22 Basketball League of Serbia.

In the summer of 2022, Partizan received a wild card from the EuroLeague to compete in the competition for the 2022–23 season; it would be return to the competition after eight years. On 20 October 2022 Partizan won his first game in EuroLeague after 3.121 days by beating Virtus Bologna 90–62 in Štark Arena.

Sponsorship naming 
Partizan has had several denominations through the years due to its sponsorship:

Supporters

Grobari (Serbian Cyrillic: Гробари, English: The Gravediggers) are supporters of the Belgrade football club Partizan. They generally support all clubs within the Partizan multi-sport club, especially football and basketball club. According to the "Ultras World" organization, which gathers over 400,000 fans on social networks, they are ranked in the TOP 10 supporters in the world. In March 2009, in Kombank Arena in the Euroleague TOP 16 game between Partizan and Panathinaikos, Grobari appointed the league's attendance record – 22,567. Partizan has been the most watched team for many years in a row in Adriatic League.

Seasons

Home arenas

Partizan until recently played most of their home games at Aleksandar Nikolić Hall, located in the Belgrade municipality of Palilula. The arena, then named Pionir Hall, was built in 1973 in eleven months, by Energoprojekt. Basketball was popular in Yugoslavia at the time, and although Hall Aleksandar Nikolić hosted many different sport events (volleyball, handball) it became known as a basketball arena. It has a seating capacity of 8,000. Aleksandar Nikolić Hall is also the home of Partizan's main rival Red Star Belgrade. In the first twenty-three years (1945–1968), the club played their home games at open basketball courts on Belgrade Fortress before moving to Ranko Žeravica Hall. For 24 seasons (1968–1992), Partizan played their home games at Ranko Žeravica Hall, located in Belgrade municipality of New Belgrade.

In the 2008–09 season, Partizan played their home games of the EuroLeague Top 16 in the Kombank Arena. On 5 March 2009 against Greek team Panathinaikos, a record crowd of 22,567 was set for the EuroLeague. Partizan also holds the record for highest single-game attendance in the ABA League history, with 16,531 fans attending the match against KK Budućnost on 9 February 2020. Partizan has been involved in the top 4 single-game attendances in the history of the regional competition (three of them as a host).

In June 2019, Partizan signed a contract with Štark Arena to be its main home arena until the end of 2023–24 season.

Players

Numerous Partizan players have won medals competing for their national teams and several have been internationally recognized for their outstanding contribution to the game of basketball:

 Dražen Dalipagić: enshrined in the Basketball Hall of Fame in 2004, enshrined in the FIBA Hall of Fame in 2007, included in 50 Greatest Euroleague Contributors.
 Vlade Divac: enshrined in the Basketball Hall of Fame in 2019, enshrined in the FIBA Hall of Fame in 2010, included in 50 Greatest Euroleague Contributors.
 Dragan Kićanović: enshrined in the FIBA Hall of Fame in 2010.
 Aleksandar Đorđević: included in 50 Greatest Euroleague Contributors.
 Predrag Danilović: included in 50 Greatest Euroleague Contributors.

Partizan has provided a number of NBA players since 1989. In total, thirteen were drafted while at Partizan with five of them selected in the first round of the NBA draft, with the highest pick being the 6th place on the 2011 Draft for Jan Veselý. Most notable NBA players who came through the ranks of Partizan include the likes of Hall-of-Famer Vlade Divac and rookie-all stars Željko Rebrača, Nenad Krstić and Bogdan Bogdanović.

Current roster

Depth chart

Head coaches

There have been thirty head coaches for Partizan since the founding of the club in 1945. The first head coach was Božo Grkinić who coached Partizan for two seasons. The first coach to bring Partizan an official trophy was Borislav Ćorković. He won Yugoslav League with Partizan in 1976. Club won the first international trophy in 1978, while being coached by Ranko Žeravica. Željko Obradović lead the club to the most significant trophy, Euroleague in 1992. Duško Vujošević is the most successful coach in the club's history. In his four stints with Partizan he won a total of twenty-three trophies.

Several Partizan coaches have been recognized internationally for their contribution to the game of basketball:
 Aleksandar Nikolić: enshrined in the Basketball Hall of Fame, FIBA Hall of Fame (class of 2007) and included in 50 Greatest Euroleague Contributors. 
 Dušan Ivković: enshrined in FIBA Hall of Fame(class of 2017) and included in 50 Greatest Euroleague Contributors.
 Ranko Žeravica: enshrined in FIBA Hall of Fame(class of 2007). 
 Željko Obradović: included in 50 Greatest Euroleague Contributors.

Another former Partizan coach, Borislav Stanković, was also enshrined in both the Basketball Hall of Fame and FIBA Hall of Fame, although not as a coach but as a contributor.

Honours

Partizan has won thirty-seven domestic trophies, including twenty-one championships, of which thirteen were won consecutively, and sixteen cups, of which five were won consecutively. They have also won six Adriatic championships, first five of them consecutive. In European competitions in the late 1970s, they won two back-to-back Korać Cups in 1978 and 1979. They also won another Korać Cup in 1989.  In 1992, Partizan won the club's first – and to date only – EuroLeague title, downing Joventut Badalona 70–71 on a miraculous buzzer-beater by Aleksandar Đorđević, which ranks among the most amazing shots in European basketball history. Overall, Partizan has won forty-eight trophies, which makes it the most successful basketball club in Serbia.

 Shared record

Season by season

In European and worldwide competitions

Matches against NBA teams
Partizan is the first and so far only club from Serbia that played games against NBA teams. On the 2009 Euroleague American Tour, Partizan played against Denver Nuggets and Phoenix Suns.

Players in the NBA draft

Management

Sponsorships

See also
 List of basketball clubs in Serbia by major honours won
 KK Partizan in Europe (EuroLeague)
 Crvena Zvezda–Partizan basketball rivalry

References

External links

  
 KK Partizan at euroleague.net
 KK Partizan at abaliga.com

 
Basketball teams in Yugoslavia
Basketball teams established in 1945
EuroLeague-winning clubs
Basketball teams in Belgrade